The list includes those individuals who were, or have claimed to have served in the Parachute Regiment (regular or Territorial Army) of the British Army:

 Michael Asherauthor and desert explorer
 Ian BaileyMilitary Medal recipient during the Falklands War
 Chay BlythSolo Yachtsman & Atlantic rower.
 Nick BrownSAS Soldier †
 Charles (Nish) Bruce QGM – 22 SAS Sergeant & Pilot
 Bryan BuddVC recipient †
 Mark Burnetttelevision producer and Falklands War veteran
 Karl Bushbyadventurer and author
 Frank Carsoncomedian and Operation Musketeer veteran
 Charlie Christodoulou, Angolan War mercenary †
 Eddie CollinsSAS Soldier †
 Lewis Collinsactor
 Billy Connollyactor and comedian
 Bernard Cribbinsactor
 Carl CrookBritish and Commonwealth lightweight boxing champion
 Peter Cundalltelevision presenter
 Paddy DoyleWorld Record breaking multi-disciplinary athlete
 Andrew Edge4 PARA
 Sir Anthony Farrar-Hockley  †
 Dair Farrar-Hockley MC
 Joshua French prisoner on death row of Democratic Republic of Congo
 'Johnny' FrostOperation Market Garden veteran †
 Costas Georgiou (also known as "Colonel Callan")Angolan War mercenary †
 Tony Geraghtyauthor
 Frederick GoughFormer MP for Horsham †
 John GrayburnVictoria Cross recipient
 Herbert 'H' JonesVictoria Cross recipient †
 Tim Healyactor
 Jon Hollingsworth CGC QGMSAS soldier †
 Sir Mike Jacksonformer British Army Chief of the General Staff
 Dan JarvisMember of Parliament for Barnsley Central
 Al Koran (Edward C Doe) Magician and mentalist
 Tom McCleanWorld Record breaking Atlantic sailor
 Ian McKayVictoria Cross recipient †
 John Moggformer DSACEUR
 Joe Murray, television personality
 Sean OlssonWinter Olympics bobsleigh bronze medalist
 Alastair Pearson 
 Sir Hew Pike KCB DSO MBE ]
 Richard Pine-Coffin, DSO and Bar, MC  †
 David PurleyF1, F3 and F5000 racing driver George Medal recipient †
 Lionel Ernest QueripelVictoria Cross recipient †
 Peter Ratcliffe DCM MIDauthor
 Trevor Rees-JonesDodi Al-Fayed and Diana, Princess of Wales' former bodyguard
 John RidgwayAtlantic rower. 
 Chris Ryanauthor and television presenter
 Al Slater MMSAS soldier †
 Sir James Spicer
 Richard Toddactor
 Steve Trugliaworld record-breaker and stunt performer
 John Waddy Ex commander SAS, advisor on the film A Bridge Too Far.
 Dean WardWinter Olympic bobsleigh bronze medalist
 Michael WillettsGeorge Cross recipient †
 Levison Wood Author and Explorer.
 Mark WrightGeorge Cross recipient †

References

 01
 01
Parachute Regiment
Parachute Regiment
Parachute Regiment (United Kingdom) personnel
.